Bnei Yehuda is an Israeli settlement organized as a moshav located in the southern Golan Heights, under the administration of Israel. The moshav was built in 1972 and falls under the municipal jurisdiction of the Golan Regional Council. The international community considers Israeli settlements in the Golan Heights illegal under international law, but the Israeli and the U.S government disputes this.

History

Ottoman era
In the winter of 1885, members of the Old Yishuv in Safed formed the Beit Yehuda Society and purchased 15,000 dunams of land from the village of Ramthaniye in the central Golan. Due to financial hardships and difficulty in securing a kushan (Ottoman land deed) the site was abandoned a year later. Soon afterwards, the society regrouped and purchased 2,000 dunams of land from the village of Bir e-Shagum on the western slopes of the Golan.

In 1890, six houses were built with the help of Hovevei Zion from London. In 1906, the population was 33, and land area was 3,500 dunams (3.5 km2). A Hashomer scheme to settle more farmers there in 1913 was not successful. The Jews fled in the wake of the 1920 Nebi Musa riots. The last to depart was the Bernstein family, who left on 25 April 1920 after Arabs attacked the village and killed two family members.

Modern village
Modern Bnei Yehuda was founded in 1972 east of the former site by workers of the Negev Nuclear Research Center and Israel Aircraft Industries, following an appeal by the Jewish Agency. The village is located on top of the depopulated and demolished Syrian village of Sqoufiya.

References

Israeli settlements in the Golan Heights
Golan Regional Council
Moshavim
Jewish villages in the Ottoman Empire
Populated places in Northern District (Israel)
Populated places established in 1972
1972 establishments in the Israeli Military Governorate